Incredible is the second Korean studio album by JYJ member Kim Junsu (stage name:  XIA). It was released digitally and physically on July 15, 2013. The same day MelOn TV and LOEN Entertainment streamed his live showcase, the latter via YouTube and uStream.

18,000 tickets for the connecting Xia 2nd Asia Tour Concert Incredible in Seoul to be held later were sold in 15 minutes.

Track list

Controversy

References

Kakao M albums
2013 albums
Korean-language albums
Kim Junsu albums